Jalal Khoury (born in Beirut on 28 May 1933 – died on 3 December 2017) was a playwright, theatre director, comedian and artistic editor.

First Lebanese playwright to be translated and performed internationally, his works are translated into German, English, Armenian, Iranian and French. His play "Al Rafiq Segean" ran for two consecutive seasons at the Volkstheater Rostock. Known for being the political theatre promoter in the 1960s Lebanon, Khoury is also an ethnoscenologist. He has participated in several colloquiums in Paris and Mexico about Ethnoscenology, a new discipline that he represents in Lebanon. Khoury is also the author of several papers on theatre and arts, in French and Arabic, published in Lebanon and abroad, as well as an amount of scenic adaptations and theory critical writings in French and Arabic, featured in several periodicals and catalogues. Jalal Khoury died in his home on December 2, 2017 because of a sudden heart-attack.

Biographical entries

 Artistic French editor (Le soir, L'Orient Littéraire, Magazine...) in the 1960s.
 Starts his theatre career in 1962 at the francophone college theater in the frame of the École supérieure des lettres (Centre universitaire d'études dramatiques - C.U.E.D.).
 Starts his directing career in 1964 with Bertolt Brecht "The Visions of Simone Machard".
 Teaches theatre at the Lebanese University (The Fine Arts Faculty) from 1968 until 1975.
 Founder and president of the Lebanese center of the International Theatre Institute (Unesco annex) from 1969 until 1984.
 President of the International Theatre Institute Permanent Committee of the Third-World from 1973 until 1977.
 Teaches theatre (theory and practice) and script writing at the Saint Joseph University (Institut d'Etudes scéniques, audiovisuelles et cinématographiques) from 1988 until 2012.
 Chairman of the Theatre Department of the Saint Joseph University (Institut d'Etudes scéniques, audiovisuelles et cinématographiques) from 1988 until 1999.
 Taught Scenic-arts for the Masters Students of the Saint Joseph University (Event planning Masters) until 2017

References

External links

1933 births
2017 deaths
20th-century dramatists and playwrights
21st-century dramatists and playwrights
20th-century Lebanese poets
21st-century Lebanese poets
Lebanese dramatists and playwrights
Lebanese artists
Lebanese comedians
Lebanese male poets
20th-century Lebanese male actors
Acting theorists
Lebanese male film actors
Lebanese male stage actors
Modern artists
Surrealist dramatists and playwrights
Surrealist poets
Lebanese surrealist writers
Theatre practitioners
French-language poets
Lebanese theatre directors
Writers from Beirut
Lebanese male actors
Lebanese art directors
20th-century male writers
21st-century male writers
Artists from Beirut